Christopher Thompson may refer to:

 Christopher Thompson (actor) (born 1966), French actor and script author
 Christopher Thompson (runner) (born 1981), British long-distance runner
 Christopher Newton Thompson (1919–2002), South African soldier, sportsman, educationalist and anti-apartheid politician
 Christopher Thompson (astronomer) (born 1961), Canadian astronomer and astrophysicist, see Bruno Rossi Prize

See also 
 Chris Thompson (disambiguation)